Luciano Rodríguez Rosales (born 16 July 2003) is a Uruguayan professional footballer who plays as a forward for Liverpool Montevideo.

Club career
Rodríguez is a youth academy graduate of Progreso. He made his professional debut for the club on 17 January 2021 in a goalless draw against Montevideo City Torque.

On 27 December 2022, Liverpool Montevideo announced the signing of Rodríguez.

International career
Rodríguez is a current Uruguayan youth national team player. In January 2023, he was named in Uruguay's squad for the 2023 South American U-20 Championship.

Personal life
Luciano's twin brother Emiliano Rodríguez is also a professional footballer.

Career statistics

References

External links
 

Living people
2003 births
Footballers from Montevideo
Association football forwards
Uruguayan footballers
Uruguayan Primera División players
C.A. Progreso players
Liverpool F.C. (Montevideo) players